Joseph Blackett was an English professional footballer who played as a full back in the Football League for Wolverhampton Wanderers, Derby County, Middlesbrough and Leicester Fosse.

Personal life 
Blackett served as a sergeant in the Army Service Corps and the Labour Corps during the First World War.

Career statistics

Honours 
Middlesbrough

 Football League Second Division second-place promotion: 1901–02

Leicester Fosse

 Football League Second Division second-place promotion: 1907–08

References 

English Football League players
Place of death missing
British Army personnel of World War I
English footballers
Newcastle United F.C. players
1875 births
Year of death missing
Association football fullbacks
Association football inside forwards
Footballers from Newcastle upon Tyne
Royal Army Service Corps soldiers
Willington Athletic F.C. players
Loughborough F.C. players
Wolverhampton Wanderers F.C. players
Derby County F.C. players
Sunderland A.F.C. players
Middlesbrough F.C. players
Luton Town F.C. players
Leicester City F.C. players
Rochdale A.F.C. players
Barrow A.F.C. players

Royal Pioneer Corps soldiers